Coraebosoma is a genus of beetles in the family Buprestidae, containing the following species:

 Coraebosoma carteri Hoscheck, 1931
 Coraebosoma indicum Bellamy, 1990
 Coraebosoma manilense Obenberger, 1923
 Coraebosoma mindoroense Ohmomo, 2002
 Coraebosoma negrosianum Bellamy, 1990
 Coraebosoma panayense Bellamy, 1990
 Coraebosoma samarense Bellamy, 1990
 Coraebosoma sibuyanicum Bellamy, 1990
 Coraebosoma violaceum Bellamy, 1990
 Coraebosoma viridis Bellamy & Ohmomo, 2009

References

Buprestidae genera